The 2022 Asian Alpine Ski Championships were the 30th Asian Alpine Ski Championships and took place from February 24–26, 2022, in Mzaar Kfardebian, Lebanon.

Medal summary

Men

Women

Medal table

References

External links
Results

Alpine Ski Championships
Asian
Asian Alpine Ski Championships
International sports competitions hosted by Lebanon
Asian Alpine Ski Championships